Gwendolyn Galsworth is the American president and founder of Visual Thinking Inc. and an author, a researcher, teacher, consultant, publisher and thought leader in the field of visuality in the workplace and visual management. Her books, which have won multiple Shingo Prize awards in the Research and Professional Publication category, focus on conceptualizing and codifying workplace visuality into a single, comprehensive framework of knowledge and know-how called the "visual workplace."

Dr. Galsworth was one of the ten original members of the Productivity Inc. team assembled by Norman Bodek in the early 1980s to establish that company as the premier resource for books and intelligence from Japan that documented and explained what was then called The Japanese Manufacturing Miracle, richly exemplified by the Toyota Production System.

Today, she continues to consult and teach, lead visual conversions, and create books, videos, and self-standing online training systems on the principles, practices, and methods known as the technologies of the visual workplace. She is a frequent keynote speaker on the business improvement conference circuit and hosted a weekly web-based radio show for seven years, initially called “The Visual Workplace” and then “Visual Workplace Radio.”

Early life and education
Galsworth was born (March 1956) in upper New York State to Russian mother, Geraldine, and Swiss father, Donato Galsworth. Raised in New Jersey, she graduated from Montclair State Teachers College at the top of her Latin class. After teaching Latin in New Jersey, she started an acting career in New York, studying at the Gene Frankel Studio and performing in many traditional, experimental, and off-B’way plays. Galsworth traveled to Europe where she studied French at the Sorbonne, learned Italian, and acted in Paris and London.
Returning to New York, Galsworth joined the experimental acting group, The Performance Garage (Richard Schechner), and then traveled to Poland to study with experimental director, Jerzy Grotowski. This was followed by an invitation to audition for Peter Brook and his London-based National Repertory Theatre. She later enrolled in a Master’s Program/Hunter College in Special Education for the Deaf and Hearing Impaired. Her vision was to establish a theatre where deaf people performed not with the language of signing, such as the National Theatre of the Deaf (NTD) promoted, but through a unique language of physical and sound images that deaf actors would discover from their own expressive resources. Though NTD ultimately dominated the field, Galsworth’s interest in visual and sensory language equivalents had begun. Galsworth received both her Masters and PhD in Education and Statistics from Indiana University in Bloomington, Indiana.

Productivity, Inc.
A chance connection led her to Productivity, Inc. and the new offices of Norman Bodek where she became head of Training, Consulting, and Development. Her position brought her into close working relationship with many Japanese master practitioners, including the co-architect of the Toyota Production System, Shigeo Shingo, head of the Shingijutsu Consulting Group, Yoshiki Iwata, Sumitomo’s Ryuji Fukuda, as well as Seiichi Nakajima and Hiroyuki Hirano.
During this period, Galsworth led study missions to Japan and worked closely with Dr. Fukuda to develop his CEDAC methodology into a process that western companies could successfully deploy. Shortly before his passing, Dr. Shingo asked Galsworth to pursue the development of his Poka-Yoke/Zero Defect paradigm into a more complete and western-oriented improvement methodology, which task she successfully completed two years later.

Quality Methods International, Inc.
Leaving Productivity, Galsworth formed Quality Methods International in order to specialize in the research, articulation, and deployment of workplace visuality as a single, sustainable improvement framework. Since then, she has continued to focus on codifying a range of principles and practices, resulting in an array of methods called the technologies of the visual workplace. 
During this same decade, Galsworth became a Malcolm Baldrige Award Examiner and an examiner for The Shingo Prize for Operational Excellence. She remained a Shingo Examiner.
Later, the Shingo Prize Office at Utah State University invited Galsworth to create an online course on the visual workplace as part of its newly launched Shingo Prize eCurriculum in Operational Excellence. Hers was the first external course in this curriculum.

Visual Thinking, Inc
Galsworth established the Visual-Lean Institute in 2005 to further the research and teaching of visual workplace related methods and their integration with lean thinking and operational excellence. Shortly thereafter, she changed the name of her company to Visual Thinking Inc. to more closely align with that purpose and her life-long mission of helping companies create and sustain a workforce of visual thinkers. For seven years, she hosted her own weekly radio show on VoiceAmerica to un-nest and discuss all issues related to this mission (originally named “The Visual Workplace;” later “Visual Workplace Radio”). 

In the new millennium, Galsworth’s development and refinement of workplace visuality into a comprehensive field of operational knowledge and know-how has widened and deepened.  

Her recent additions to visual workplace knowledge and know-how include the “Principles and Practices of Visual Leadership,” a comprehensive array of methods and constructs that help executives develop a set of leadership skills that shift their identities from checking and monitoring to deciding and driving. In this way, they become improvement decision-makers and leaders who align and inspire. Hand-in-hand, Galsworth develop a second set of skills and tools that enables supervisors and managers to shift their identities from managing and expediting logistics to becoming authentic leaders of improvement on a day-to-day basis. Her ability to create learning pathways that develop visual thinking in participants continued.

Galsworth’s mission to codify the field of workplace visuality into a coherent system of change, personal growth and ownership, and enterprise success triggered another area of knowledge/know-how contribution she titled “High-Performance Work Systems.” In it, she developed a meticulous step-by-step process that allows managers to define, design, and develop highly integrated improvement activities and outcomes anchored in self-feedback work systems that are congruent with the work of J.M. Forrester. Central to her approach is a template of seven interactive elements that allow each such work system to self-learn and self-correct based on the designed behavior of each of those elements.

Poland
Galsworth moved to Poland in 2022 in order to establish Visual Thinking/Europe and help companies there convert to a workplace that speaks.

Awards
2011: Shingo Research and Professional Publication Award for Work That Makes Sense: Operator-led Visuality
2006: Shingo Research and Professional Publication Award for Visual Workplace/Visual Thinking: Creating Enterprise Excellence Through the Technologies of the Visual Workplace

Bibliography

Books by Galsworth
Galsworth has written seven books on workplace visuality and other core improvement methods. She began with Smart Simple Design: Using Variety Effectiveness to Reduce Total Cost and Maximize Customer Selection (John Wiley, 1994) on the importance of simplifying a company’s product architecture in order to de-complicate the enterprise, end-to-end (“all costs adhere to the part”). She wrote a second edition to this book in 2014, entitled Smart Simple Design/Reloaded: Variety Effectiveness and the Cost of Complexity (Visual-Lean Enterprise Press). 

In 1997, Galsworth wrote her first book on workplace visuality, titled Visual Systems: Harnessing the Power of the Visual Workplace (Amacom). This was followed in 1998 by Visual Workplace/Visual Order Associate Handbook and Visual Workplace/Visual Order Instructor Guide (Visual-Lean Enterprise Press). 

In 2005, she released Visual Workplace/Visual Thinking: Creating Enterprise Excellence Through the Technologies of the Visual Workplace (Visual-Lean Enterprise Press), with her second edition of this book published by Productivity Press in 2017. Her seventh book, Work That Makes Sense: Operator-Led Visuality, was published in 2011 (Visual-Lean Enterprise Press), with a second edition published by Productivity Press in 2022. 
Visual Workplace/Visual Thinking and Work That Makes Sense are both recipients of the Shingo Publication Award.

Chapters
The Visual Workplace: Letting the Workplace Speak, The Lean Handbook, (2012) Tony Manos and Chad Vincent, editors

Articles

 Invasion of the Kaizen Blitzers, Target Magazine, (March–April 1995)
 The Value of Vision, Industrial Engineer (August 2004)
 The Visual Pharmaceutical Workplace, Pharmaceutical Manufacturing (January 2006) 
 Advancing Quality Though Visual Thinking, Quality Digest (February 2009) 
 The Visual Workplace: Translating Vital Information into Exact Behavior, Pharmaceutical Manufacturing (May 2009) 
 The Visual Workplace, Quality Digest (August 5, 2010)
 Visual Devices: Letting the Workplace Speak, Quality Digest (August 12, 2010)
 Information Deficits and the Visual Workplace, Quality Digest (August 19, 2010)
 What The Operator Sees, Lean Management Journal (July 2012) 
 Vistaprint’s Secret: Sensory Information-Sharing, Lean Management Journal (March 2013)
 Hidden in Plain Sight, Lean Management Journal (July 2013)

References

Living people
Writers from New York (state)
American educational theorists
Year of birth missing (living people)